Sven Tomas Johansson (born 12 August 1969) is a former Swedish badminton player. He competed at the 1996 and 2000 Summer Olympics in the men's singles event. Play for Västra Frölunda BMK, Johansson was two times men's singles National Champion in 1993 and 2000. Johansson was the men's singles silver medalist at the 1994 European Championships, also won the gold medal in the mixed team event.

Achievements

European Championships 
Men's singles

IBF World Grand Prix
The World Badminton Grand Prix sanctioned by International Badminton Federation (IBF) since 1983.

Men's singles

IBF International
Men's singles

References

External links
 
 
 

1969 births
Living people
Sportspeople from Gothenburg
Swedish male badminton players
Olympic badminton players of Sweden
Badminton players at the 2000 Summer Olympics
Badminton players at the 1996 Summer Olympics
20th-century Swedish people